Hypoprepia is a genus of moths in the family Erebidae. The genus was erected by Jacob Hübner in 1831.

Species
Hypoprepia miniata (Kirby, 1837)
Hypoprepia fucosa Hübner, [1831]
Hypoprepia cadaverosa Strecker, 1878
Hypoprepia inculta H. Edwards, 1882

References

External links

Cisthenina
Moth genera